S51 may refer to:

Aircraft 
 Blériot-SPAD S.51, a French biplane fighter
 SIAI S.51, an Italian racing flying boat
 Sikorsky S-51, an American helicopter

Other uses 
 S51 (New York City bus) serving Staten Island
 S51 (RER Fribourg), a rail line in Fribourg, Switzerland
 County Route S51 (Bergen County, New Jersey)
 Nikon Coolpix S51, a digital camera
 S51: Use only in well-ventilated areas, a safety phrase
 S-51 Self-Propelled Gun, a Soviet experimental howitzer
 Shorland S51, a British armoured car
 Tswa language
 , a submarine of the United States Navy
 Toyota S51, a Toyota S transmission